Tumko Na Bhool Paayenge is a 2002 Indian action thriller film directed by Pankaj Parashar.The films stars Salman Khan, Sushmita Sen and Dia Mirza. The film was later remade in Bangladesh as Jor Kore Bhalobasha Hoy Na starring by Shakib Khan.

Plot 

Veer Thakur (Salman Khan) is an eligible young bachelor living in a small community with his parents: Thakur Punya Pratap Singh (Sharat Saxena) and Thakurain Geeta (Nishigandha Wad). He is in love with Muskaan (Dia Mirza), his friend & daughter of another Thakur. Their parents give their support to the union, but Veer suddenly starts getting visions of events that he can't remember ever happening to him & finds that he is an expert in fighting techniques no pehelwaan (wrestler), including his father, have ever seen before. Nobody has any explanation for these facts.

One day, as the Chief Minister (Anjan Srivastav), is giving a speech at a certain function in his village, Veer suddenly spots a sniper trying to aim at the CM. Veer lunges to save the CM, only to find that the sniper and the building are both missing. Veer grows restless, but nobody notices that the CM has grown restless on seeing Veer. Some days later, at Veer's wedding, some goons attack the party and try to kill Veer, but Veer kills them singlehandedly. Convinced that everyone is hiding something important from him, he demands answers. The Thakur relents and tells him that he is neither Veer nor their son.

The real Veer (Arbaaz Khan) was an officer in the Indian Army who was killed in action in Kargil War. After immersing in his ashes, he found the bullet-ridden body of an unknown man. When he realized that this man had no memories of his past, he told him that he is Veer & concoct a past for him, because they feel the need to have a son. Veer decides to go on a quest to find his real identity. He goes to Mumbai to find that both the police and goons are baying for his blood. He meets a teenager named Ahsan, aka Munna (Sumeet Pathak), who calls him Ali Bhaijaan (brother), but Munna dies while trying to save Ali from an assassin. The hero does not see the face of the assassin but assumes that his name is Ali. He gets visions of a girl (Sushmita Sen) whom he has never seen.

The mystery starts unwinding when he meets a guy named Inder (Inder Kumar). As Ali starts getting his past memories, it is confirmed that his name is indeed Ali. Ali & Munna were orphaned brothers, while Inder was Ali's friend. An old man named Rahim Chacha (Alok Nath) was their guardian. The mysterious girl Ali saw was Mehak, his love. Ali and Inder had won medals for shooting during many contests, although Ali was always better. The marksmanship skills are noticed by the Joint Commissioner of Mumbai Crime Branch, M.K. Sharma (Mukesh Rishi), who makes a proposal to them: masquerade as goons of a gang, kill goons of their rival gang & trick both the gangs to destroy each other in gang wars. Ali refuses flatly, but after some goons kill Rahim Chacha, Ali & Inder decide to take the offer.

Mehak gives both the guys' portable video recorders, so that they can prove their innocence if anything goes wrong. Soon, the Inspector takes them to the Chief Minister (Sadashiv Amrapurkar) & his aide (Anjan Srivastav). They plan to enact an attack on the CM, making the opposition look dirty in the eyes of the people & garnering sympathy votes for the CM. However, when Ali is trying to fake the shooting, somebody really kills the CM. The police start chasing Ali, thinking that he is the killer & Ali flees.

After recovering his memory, Ali realizes that the CM's aide took advantage of the plan to become CM himself. Meanwhile, Ali learns that Inder made Mehak his wife to save her from harassment. Ali tries to tell the truth to the Inspector but realizes that nobody believes him. In an attack, when Ali goes aboard a local train, the remaining memories come to him. He remembers boarding the train the same way on the day of the assassination, where Inder met him & confessed to killing the CM. Thereafter, Inder shot Ali to hide the truth & threw his body in a river. Suddenly, the Inspector confronts him, and Ali convinces the Inspector by telling the truth.

Ali goes to Mehak & tells her everything. He realizes that there must be some incriminating evidence in Inder's tapes. As he plays a tape, Mehak witnesses in horror Inder striking the deal with the CM's aide. Ali notifies Inder that he remembers everything now. Inder, along with his cronies, come to kill Ali, and Mehak dies in the process. This angers Ali, and he kills the goons. Inder and Ali have a hand-to-hand fight. Ali demands Inder an explanation for his actions.

Inder reveals that he was always second best with Ali around & that even Mehak, whom he secretly loved, chose Ali over him. Also, Ali always got money & fame more easily than Inder. Inder reveals that he had sent the goons to kill Rahim Chacha, thus manipulating Ali to take the offer. Also, when Ali came back to Bombay, Inder saw him. Inder was the sniper whom Ali's brother, Munna, saw.

Ali kills Inder in combat and afterwards broadcasts Inder's tape over the cable TV network, thus freeing himself from his charges & putting the present CM in the dock. He returns to the village and marries Muskaan, just as planned.

Cast 
 Salman Khan as Ali / Veer Singh Thakur 
 Sushmita Sen as Mehak
 Diya Mirza as Muskan Singh
 Inder Kumar as  Inder Saxena
 Nishigandha Wad as  Geeta Singh Thakur
 Sharat Saxena as Thakur Punya Pratap Singh
 Mukesh Rishi as JCP Manoj Kumar Sharma
 Rajpal Yadav as  Lallan
 Sadashiv Amrapurkar as Chief Minister
 Anjan Srivastav as Home Minister Sadanand Pandey
 Pankaj Dheer as  Shivpratap Singh
 Alok Nath as Rahim Chacha 
 Razak Khan as  Dilbar Khan
 Johnny Lever as  Pakhandee Baba
 Sumeet Pathak as Munna
 Arbaaz Khan as Veer Singh Thakur (Special appearance)

Soundtrack

Release 
This movie came out when Salman Khan was in the news for all the wrong reasons- Aishwarya Rai break-up, This contributed to its dismal showing at the box office despite receiving good critic ratings.

Reception 
A critic from Rediff wrpte that "Tumko Na Bhool Payenge is not a performance-oriented film, so there's not much to go by. Salman Khan's transition from a timid, happy-go-lucky fellow to a tough-as-nails, man-on-a-mission is far from convincing".

References

External links

2000s Hindi-language films
2002 films
Indian action thriller films
Films directed by Pankuj Parashar
2002 action thriller films